Haymarket station is the name of:

Haymarket railway station in Edinburgh, Scotland
Haymarket station (MBTA) in Boston, Massachusetts, USA
Haymarket station (VRE), a former planned station in Haymarket, Virginia, USA
Haymarket Metro station in Newcastle, England
Haymarket bus station in Newcastle, England
Haymarket bus station, Leicester, England
Lincoln station (Nebraska), also known as Haymarket